Bredal  is a surname. Notable people with this surname include:
Erik Bredal
Anne Margrethe Bredal
Ivar Bredal
Peter Bredal
Johan Olaf Bredal
Wilhelm Engel Bredal

Stine Bredal Oftedal
Hanna Bredal Oftedal
Wilhelm Olssøn (Christian Wilhelm Engel Bredal Olssøn)

See also

Bredahl
Brodal
Brodahl